The Mongolian Traditional United Party (, Mongolyn Ulamjlalyn Negdsen Nam) is a national-conservative political party in Mongolia founded in 1993.

Mission 
The party's mission is to "institute presidential government, make a Mongolia that pursues an independent policy, has a population of millions, with pristine nature, respects its traditions and culture, prosperous country and build its conditions for sustainable development".

History 
On 5 December 1993, the Mongolian Party for Independence, Mongolian United Party of Cattle Breeders and Peasants and Mongolian United Party of Private Owners merged and established the Mongolian Traditional United Party. For the 1996 Mongolian legislative election, the party nominated 16 candidates, but only Ochirbatyn Dashbalbar was elected to State Great Khural. As parliamentary party, it nominated former Chairperson of People's Great Khural Jambyn Gombojav in the 1997 Mongolian presidential election, but he won only 6.6% of the vote, coming in third place. After Dashbalbar's death in 1999, poet Ürjingiin Khurelbaatar became the party's chairperson. In 2006 he was replaced by general secretary Batdelgeriin Batbold.

Our coalition
In March 2020, the party, alongside the Mongolian People's Revolutionary Party and Civil Will–Green Party, formed Our Coalition to run in the 2020 Mongolian legislative election.

Electoral history

Presidential elections

State Great Khural elections

References

Political parties in Mongolia